In geometry, the cross-ratio, also called the double ratio and anharmonic ratio, is a number associated with a list of four collinear points, particularly points on a projective line.

 

where an orientation of the line determines the sign of each distance and the distance is measured as projected into Euclidean space. (If one of the four points is the line's point at infinity, then the two distances involving that point are dropped from the formula.)
The cross-ratio can therefore be regarded as measuring the quadruple's deviation from this ratio; hence the name anharmonic ratio.

The cross-ratio is preserved by linear fractional transformations.  It is essentially the only projective invariant of a quadruple of collinear points; this underlies its importance for projective geometry.  

The cross-ratio had been defined in deep antiquity, possibly already by Euclid, and was considered by Pappus, who noted its key invariance property. It was extensively studied in the 19th century. 

Variants of this concept exist for a quadruple of concurrent lines on the projective plane and a quadruple of points on the Riemann sphere.
In the Cayley–Klein model of hyperbolic geometry, the distance between points is expressed in terms of a certain cross-ratio.

Terminology and history

Pappus of Alexandria made implicit use of concepts equivalent to the cross-ratio in his Collection: Book VII. Early users of Pappus included Isaac Newton, Michel Chasles, and Robert Simson. In 1986 Alexander Jones made a translation of the original by Pappus, then wrote a commentary on how the lemmas of Pappus relate to modern terminology.

Modern use of the cross ratio in projective geometry began with Lazare Carnot in 1803 with his book Géométrie de Position. Chasles coined the French term  [anharmonic ratio] in 1837. German geometers call it  [double ratio].

Carl von Staudt was unsatisfied with past definitions of the cross-ratio relying on algebraic manipulation of Euclidean distances rather than being based purely on synthetic projective geometry concepts. His algebra of throws provides an approach to numerical propositions, usually taken as axioms, but proven in projective geometry.

The English term "cross-ratio" was introduced in 1878 by William Kingdon Clifford.

Definition

 

For colinear displacements this is a dimensionless quantity.

If the displacements themselves are taken to be signed real numbers, then the cross ratio between points can be written

The same formulas can be applied to four distinct complex numbers or, more generally, to elements of any field, and can also be projectively extended as above to the case when one of them is

Properties
 
where  describes the ratio with which the point  divides the line segment , and  describes the ratio with which the point  divides that same line segment. We can easily deduce that

Six cross-ratios 
Four points can be ordered in  ways, but there are only six ways for partitioning them into two unordered pairs. Thus, four points can have only six different cross-ratios, which are related as:
 
 
See Anharmonic group below.

Projective geometry

The cross-ratio is a projective invariant in the sense that it is preserved by the projective transformations of a projective line.

In particular, if four points lie on a straight line  in  then their cross-ratio is a well-defined quantity, because any choice of the origin and even of the scale on the line will yield the same value of the cross-ratio.

Furthermore, let  be four distinct lines in the plane passing through the same point . Then any line  not passing through  intersects these lines in four distinct points  (if  is parallel to  then the corresponding intersection point is "at infinity"). It turns out that the cross-ratio of these points (taken in a fixed order) does not depend on the choice of a line , and hence it is an invariant of the 4-tuple of lines  

Therefore, the invariance of the cross-ratio under projective automorphisms of the line implies (in fact, is equivalent to) the independence of the cross-ratio of the four collinear points  on the lines  from the choice of the line that contains them.

Definition in homogeneous coordinates

Role in non-Euclidean geometry
Arthur Cayley and Felix Klein found an application of the cross-ratio to non-Euclidean geometry. In fact, every such invariant is expressible as a function of the appropriate cross ratio.

Hyperbolic geometry
Explicitly, let the conic be the unit circle.

(the factor one half is needed to make the curvature ). Since the cross-ratio is invariant under projective transformations, it follows that the hyperbolic distance is invariant under the projective transformations that preserve the conic .

Conversely, the group  acts transitively on the set of pairs of points  in the unit disk at a fixed hyperbolic distance.

Later, partly through the influence of Henri Poincaré, the cross ratio of four complex numbers on a circle was used for hyperbolic metrics. Being on a circle means the four points are the image of four real points under a Möbius transformation, and hence the cross ratio is a real number. The Poincaré half-plane model and Poincaré disk model are two models of hyperbolic geometry in the complex projective line.

These models are instances of Cayley–Klein metrics.

Anharmonic group and Klein four-group 
The cross-ratio may be defined by any of these four expressions:

These differ by the following permutations of the variables (in cycle notation):

We may consider the permutations of the four variables as an action of the symmetric group  on functions of the four variables. Since the above four permutations leave the cross ratio unaltered, they form the stabilizer  of the cross-ratio under this action, and this induces an effective action of the quotient group  on the orbit of the cross-ratio.

Thus, the other permutations of the four variables alter the cross-ratio to give the following six values, which are the orbit of the six-element group :

As functions of  these are examples of Möbius transformations, which under composition of functions form the Mobius group . Meanwhile, the elements
The order  elements exchange these two elements (as they do any pair other than their fixed points), and thus the action of the anharmonic group on  gives the quotient map of symmetric groups .

Geometrically, this can be visualized as the rotation group of the trigonal dihedron, which is isomorphic to the dihedral group of the triangle , as illustrated at right.

Over the field with two elements, the projective line only has three points, so this representation is an isomorphism, and is the exceptional isomorphism . In characteristic , this stabilizes the point , which corresponds to the orbit of the harmonic cross-ratio being only a single point, since .

Exceptional orbits
For certain values of  there will be greater symmetry and therefore fewer than six possible values for the cross-ratio.

These values are limit values as one pair of coordinates approach each other:

In the real case, there are no other exceptional orbits.

In the complex case, the most symmetric cross-ratio occurs when . These are then the only two values of the cross-ratio, and these are acted on according to the sign of the permutation.

Transformational approach

The cross-ratio is invariant under the projective transformations of the line. In the case of a complex projective line, or the Riemann sphere, these transformations are known as Möbius transformations. A general Möbius transformation has the form

These transformations form a group acting on the Riemann sphere, the Möbius group.

The projective invariance of the cross-ratio means that

The cross-ratio is real if and only if the four points are either collinear or concyclic, reflecting the fact that every Möbius transformation maps generalized circles to generalized circles.

The action of the Möbius group is simply transitive on the set of triples of distinct points of the Riemann sphere: given any ordered triple of distinct points, there is a unique Möbius transformation  that maps it to the triple . This transformation can be conveniently described using the cross-ratio: since  must equal , which in turn equals , we obtain

An alternative explanation for the invariance of the cross-ratio is based on the fact that the group of projective transformations of a line is generated by the translations, the homotheties, and the multiplicative inversion. The differences  are invariant under the translations

 

where  is a constant in the ground field . Furthermore, the division ratios are invariant under a homothety

Therefore, the cross-ratio is invariant under the affine transformations.

In order to obtain a well-defined inversion mapping

the affine line needs to be augmented by the point at infinity, denoted , forming the projective line . Each affine mapping  can be uniquely extended to a mapping of  into itself that fixes the point at infinity. Since the cross-ratio is also invariant under , it is invariant under any projective mapping of  into itself.

Co-ordinate description

This is an invariant of the 2-dimensional special conformal transformation such as inversion .

The imaginary part must make use of the 2-dimensional cross product

Ring homography
The concept of cross ratio only depends on the ring operations of addition, multiplication, and inversion (though inversion of a given element is not certain in a ring). Under restrictions having to do with inverses, it is possible to generate such a mapping with ring operations in the projective line over a ring. The cross ratio of four points is the evaluation of this homography at the fourth point.

Differential-geometric point of view
The theory takes on a differential calculus aspect as the four points are brought into proximity. This leads to the theory of the Schwarzian derivative, and more generally of projective connections.

Higher-dimensional generalizations

The cross-ratio does not generalize in a simple manner to higher dimensions, due to other geometric properties of configurations of points, notably collinearity – configuration spaces are more complicated, and distinct -tuples of points are not in general position.

While the projective linear group of the projective line is 3-transitive (any three distinct points can be mapped to any other three points), and indeed simply 3-transitive (there is a unique projective map taking any triple to another triple), with the cross ratio thus being the unique projective invariant of a set of four points, there are basic geometric invariants in higher dimension. The projective linear group of -space  has  dimensions (because it is  projectivization removing one dimension), but in other dimensions the projective linear group is only 2-transitive – because three collinear points must be mapped to three collinear points (which is not a restriction in the projective line) – and thus there is not a "generalized cross ratio" providing the unique invariant of  points.

Collinearity is not the only geometric property of configurations of points that must be maintained – for example, five points determine a conic, but six general points do not lie on a conic, so whether any 6-tuple of points lies on a conic is also a projective invariant. One can study orbits of points in general position – in the line "general position" is equivalent to being distinct, while in higher dimensions it requires geometric considerations, as discussed – but, as the above indicates, this is more complicated and less informative.

However, a generalization to Riemann surfaces of positive genus exists, using the Abel–Jacobi map and theta functions.

See also
 Hilbert metric

Notes

References 
 Lars Ahlfors (1953,1966,1979) Complex Analysis, 1st edition, page 25; 2nd & 3rd editions, page 78, McGraw-Hill  .
 Viktor Blåsjö (2009) "Jakob Steiner's Systematische Entwickelung: The Culmination of Classical Geometry", Mathematical Intelligencer 31(1): 21–9.
 John J. Milne (1911)  An Elementary Treatise on Cross-Ratio Geometry with Historical Notes, Cambridge University Press.
 Dirk Struik (1953) Lectures on Analytic and Projective Geometry, page 7, Addison-Wesley.
 I. R. Shafarevich & A. O. Remizov (2012) Linear Algebra and Geometry, Springer .

External links
 MathPages – Kevin Brown explains the cross-ratio in his article about Pascal's Mystic Hexagram
 Cross-Ratio at cut-the-knot
 
 

Projective geometry
Ratios